Sloup may refer to:

People
Jiří Sloup (1953–2017), Czech footballer
Josef Sloup-Štaplík (1897–1952), Czech footballer
Rudolf Sloup-Štapl (1895–1936), Czech footballer

Places in the Czech Republic
Sloup (Blansko District), a market town
Sloup v Čechách, a municipality and village
Sloup Castle, a castle